Myra B. Cohen is an American software engineer whose research focuses on software testing. She is Susan J. Rosowski Professor Emeritus of Computer Science and Engineering at the University of Nebraska–Lincoln, and Professor and Lanh and Oanh Nguyen Chair in Software Engineering at Iowa State University.

Education and career
Cohen is originally from New York City. After studying agriculture and life sciences at Cornell University, she became interested in computer science through working as a data analyst for a hospital. She went to the University of Vermont for graduate study in computer science, and earned a master's degree there in 1999. Cohen completed a Ph.D. at the University of Auckland in New Zealand in 2004. Her dissertation, Designing Test Suites for Software Interaction Testing, was supervised by Peter Gibbons.

After completing her doctorate, she became an assistant professor at the University of Nebraska–Lincoln. In 2016, she was named the Susan J. Rosowski Professor there. She took her present position at Iowa State University in 2018.

References

External links

Year of birth missing (living people)
Living people
American computer scientists
American women computer scientists
American software engineers
American women engineers
Cornell University alumni
University of Vermont alumni
University of Nebraska–Lincoln faculty
Iowa State University faculty